Zinc finger protein 346 is a protein that in humans is encoded by the ZNF346 gene.

The protein encoded by this gene is a nucleolar, zinc finger protein that preferentially binds to double-stranded (ds) RNA or RNA/DNA hybrids, rather than DNA alone. Mutational studies indicate that the zinc finger domains are not only essential for dsRNA binding, but are also required for its nucleolar localization. The encoded protein may be involved in cell growth and survival.

References

Further reading

External links 
 

Transcription factors